Sverige is the Swedish language name for Sweden.

Sverige may also refer to:

  HSwMS Sverige, a Swedish coastal defence ship used by the Swedish Navy, 1915-1953
 Sverige (yacht), 12-metre class yacht
 Sverige class coastal defence ship, a class of ships in the Swedish Navy
 "Sverige", a song by Basshunter from LOL <(^^,)>
 "Sverige", a song by Kent from Vapen & ammunition
 "Sverige", a hymn with lyrics by Verner von Heidenstam; see "Du gamla, du fria"
 "Sverige (Jag Är Insnöad På Östfronten)", a song by The Stranglers, non-album single from Black and White

See also
Sweden (disambiguation)